Dagenham East is a London Underground station located on the eastern side of the town of Dagenham in the London Borough of Barking and Dagenham, east London. The station has moderate usage for a suburban station, with approximately 3 million exits/entrances per year.

It was opened as a main line station in 1885 and was called Dagenham. The current station buildings date from the introduction of electric services in 1932 and of typical railway architectural style for the period, with little trace remaining of the station's Victorian origins. In 2006 the station was extensively refurbished by Metronet.

History

The station was initially opened as a main line station on the London, Tilbury and Southend Railway in 1885, on a new branch connecting London with Southend by a more direct route than the existing service via Rainham. Dagenham was already served by a station on the original route at Dagenham Dock,  to the south. The new station was opened as Dagenham, with the main station buildings on the up platform, which is now disused. From 1902 to 1905 the station was served by trains of the District Railway, who connected to the main line at a junction at Bow. The station was in a rural location until the building of the Becontree estate, of which it was on the eastern perimeter.

London, Tilbury and Southend Railway operation passed to the London, Midland and Scottish Railway in 1912, and in 1932 an additional set of tracks were constructed between Barking and Upminster. The current station structures originate from this period. The new tracks were electrified and permitted the District line to operate as far Upminster for the first time since 1905. An additional station was opened at Heathway in 1932 and Dagenham East was renamed to its current name in 1949. The station was predominantly served by the electric London Underground services and the main line platforms were eventually decommissioned in 1962, when those lines were overhead electrified. After nationalisation of the railways in 1948 management of the station passed to British Railways and in 1969 ownership transferred to the London Underground.

Design
The station was refurbished by Metronet in 2006 as part of a series of improvements to the London Underground. These works included the installation of CCTV, provision of customer help points connected to a control room, a new public address system, electronic customer information displays on platforms and in the ticket hall, and the erection of new enclosed waiting areas. Ticket barriers are in operation. The station has three working platforms that are used by the District line, one for each direction of travel and another for terminating trains from central London during peak times.

Location
The station serves Eastbrookend Country Park to the east. North of the station is an industrial estate and the Victoria Road stadium. To the south is predominantly residential, including the historic Dagenham village. London Buses routes 103 and 364 serve the station.

Services
The station is in London fare zone 5. The typical off-peak service from the station is twelve District line trains per hour to Upminster and twelve to Earl's Court, of which six continue to Ealing Broadway and six continue to Richmond. At peak periods some trains continue from Earl's Court to Wimbledon. Services towards central London operate from approximately 05:00 to 23:45 and services to Upminster operate from approximately 06:00 to 01:30. The journey time to Upminster is ten minutes; to Barking is ten minutes, and to Tower Hill is approximately 34 minutes. During 2011 there were 2.22 million passenger entries and exits at the station, higher than the annual usage over the preceding two years, and typical for a suburban station.

Railway station proposal
In 2015, Barking and Dagenham London Borough Council proposed the platforms on the National Rail route should be re-opened to provide interchange with c2c services, in connection with the Barking Riverside redevelopment to the south of the station. In 2022 Barking and Dagenham Council restated its aspirations for the reinstated platforms at Dagenham East as well as a new station at Castle Green.

See also
Dagenham East rail crash

References

District line stations
Tube stations in the London Borough of Barking and Dagenham
Former London, Tilbury and Southend Railway stations
Railway stations in Great Britain opened in 1885
Dagenham